In The City is a South African, one day music festival that takes place annually in Johannesburg at the Mary Fitzgerald Square.

Background

In The City was started in 2012 by Seed Experiences, the same company responsible for the Cape Town festival Rocking The Daisies. As such, both of the festivals have shared headlining acts since In The City's inception in 2012 and the first year's edition hosted Bloc Party as its international headlining act. In The City 2012 was considered a huge success as it sold out all of its tickets.

The festival is largely sponsored and endorsed by the South African telecommunications company Vodacom resulting in the festival often being called "Vodacom In The City" and "Vodacom Unlimited In The City".

Previous Editions of In The City

The following table displays the year, date and key performers of each year's edition of In The City.

See also

List of festivals in South Africa
Musical Performance
Music of South Africa
RAMFest
Splashy Fen

References

Rock festivals in South Africa
Indie rock festivals
Spring (season) events in South Africa
Festivals in Johannesburg